Tetyana Vodopyanova (born January 11, 1973 in Kyiv) is a former Ukrainian biathlete. She is a "Distinguished Master of Sports" at the Institute of Physical Education and Wellness of the Volyn National University.

Career 
World Championships
1996 - bronze medal on the relay
2000 - bronze medal on the relay
2001 - bronze medal on the relay

References
 
 

1973 births
Living people
Ukrainian female biathletes
Sportspeople from Kyiv
Olympic biathletes of Ukraine
Biathletes at the 1998 Winter Olympics
Biathletes at the 2002 Winter Olympics
Biathlon World Championships medalists